Rudolf Smend (November 5, 1851 – December 27, 1913) was a German theologian born in Lengerich, Westphalia. He was an older brother to theologian Julius Smend (1857–1930), and the father of Carl Friedrich Rudolf Smend (1882–1975), an authority on constitutional and ecclesiastical law.

He studied theology at the Universities of Göttingen, Berlin and Bonn, earning his doctorate in 1874 with a dissertation on Arabic poetry. In 1880 he became an associate professor of the Old Testament at the University of Basel, where shortly afterwards he attained the title of full professor.

In 1889 he returned to the University of Göttingen as a professor of Biblical science and Semitic languages. At Göttingen he was reunited with his former teacher Julius Wellhausen (1844–1918), who was a major influence in his professional career. Smend is largely remembered for critical examination of the Old Testament, particularly in his research involving stories of the Hexateuch. In 1907 with Alfred Rahlfs (1865–1935) he created the Septuaginta-Unternehmen (Septuagint Venture) in the Göttingen Society of Sciences.

Smend died in Ballenstedt.

Selected publications
 Der Prophet Ezechiel (The Prophet Ezekiel), 1880
 Lehrbuch der alttestamentlichen Religionsgeschichte (Textbook of Old Testament religious history), 1899
 Die Weisheit des Jesus Sirach (The wisdom of Jesus Sirach) with Hebrew glossary, 1906
 Die Erzählung des Hexateuch auf ihre Quellen untersucht (Sources of the Hexateuch investigated), 1912

References
 This article is based on a translation of an equivalent article at the German Wikipedia; sources listed as:
Friedrich Wilhelm Graf, "Smend, Hermann Rudolf". In: Neue Deutsche Biographie (NDB). Volume 24, Duncker & Humblot, Berlin 2010, S. 509 ( digitized ).
Klaus-Gunther Wesseling: "Smend, Rudolf". In: Biographisch-Bibliographisches Kirchenlexikon  (BBKL). Volume 10, Bautz, Herzberg 1995, Sp 652–655.

External links
 

1851 births
1913 deaths
People from Lengerich, Westphalia
People from the Province of Westphalia
19th-century German Protestant theologians
20th-century German Protestant theologians
19th-century German male writers
Academic staff of the University of Göttingen
German male non-fiction writers